Illuminate was a German band from Karlsruhe formed in 1993 by Johannes Berthold.

History 
They played M'era Luna in 2000, 2003 and 2010.  Their song "Dunkellicht" was on the German Alternative Charts for eight weeks in 2000, peaking at No. 4. Their 2004 album Augenblicke was released on Nuclear Blast records as well as Johannes Berthold's Gallery label. Ex-Mystic Prophecy Drummer Stefan Dittrich joined the band in 2009 after Mathias Kurth quit due to personal reasons

Musical style 
Illuminate's early albums are often associated with Neue Deutsche Todeskunst (literally, New German Death Art), especially their 1996 album Verfall.  Their music has fewer rock elements and much catchier tunes than more typical Gothic and Darkwave bands.  Illuminate's melodies often have piano accompaniment, and their later albums included more electropop elements.  Their songs often have themes such as love, loss, longing and the transience of existence.

Members

Current 

Johannes Berthold – Vocals, Piano Keyboards, Programming, Bass Guitar
Jörn Langenfeld – Guitar
Johannes Knees – Keyboards
Mareike Makosch – Vocals
Fenja Makosch – Vocals

Support 
Manja Wagner – Vocals
Sylvia Berthold – Vocals

Former 
Carmen R. Schäfer – drums
Conny Schindler – Vocals
Mathias Kurth – Drums
Stefan Dittrich – Drums
Anja Krone – Vocals
Daniela Dietz – Vocals
Markus Nauli – Keyboard
Cindy Vogel – Performer
Christian Olbert – Performer
Laura Dragoi – Performer
Ulrike Schneidewind – Performer

Discography

Albums 

Intro -	3:26
Apokalypse -	7:00
Verfall -	6:13
Welke Chrysanthemen -	4:55
Love Never Dies! - 6:56
Todesengel -	4:30
Leidenschaft -	4:59
Outro -	3:18

Intro: "Der Sturm Fährt Durchs Tal" -	4:36
Im Antlitz Der Sonne -	7:43
Blütenstaub -	6:17
Der Vampir Des Eigenen Herzens -	5:27
Epilog: "... Geschweige Denn Ein Wort" -	4:00
Intro: "Im Alten Haus" -	3:36
Der Torweg -	5:45
Die Spieluhr -	6:57
Haus Der Zeit -	6:49
Outro: "Das Wesen Im Turm" -	3:05

Intro: "Die Rückkehr Des Wesens" -	1:55
Ein Erwachen -	5:45
Der Traum Des Tänzers (Backing Vocals – Anja Seipold) -	6:10
Kühles Wasser -	4:20
Geheimes Leben (Vocals – Sonja Schödl) -	6:35
Dort Am Fenster -	6:30
Traumtanz (Vocals – Peter Herrmann) -	4:45
Nazareths Sohn -	7:25
Eine Symphonie Des Daseins (Backing Vocals – Peter Herrmann) -	10:51
Der Torweg (Live Erfurt "PH" 27 February 1998) -	5:39

Intro: "Die Geburt Der Ozeaniden" -	4:35
Nur Für Dich -	5:22
Stern Der Ungeborenen -	5:35
Letzter Blick Zurück -	5:55
Energie -	4:57
Verlorener Moment -	6:20
Zweiter Weg -	6:25
In Einer Sommernacht -	6:35
Outro: "Cryo" -	5:47

Intro: "Manchmal Noch..." -	3:23
Ein Neuer Tag -	4:49
Leuchtfeuer -	3:47
Abgeschminkt -	4:36
Dunkellicht -	3:44
Verlorene Sommer Der Kindheit -	4:12
Über Deinem Schlaf -	6:10
Jade -	6:00
Weg Ins Licht -	4:56
Nachtmusik -	5:25
Outro: "Alles, Was Blieb" -	4:36

Intro: "Von Eisverwehten Nächten..." -	3:15
Eisgang -	4:09
Bittersüßes Gift -	5:14
Coulez Mes Larmes -	4:24
Du Liebst Mich Nicht! -	4:18
...Über Den Kalten Horizont... -	4:52
Unerreichte Welt -	4:10
Ferne Städte -	5:55
Kaltes Verlangen -	6:40
Outro: "...Hin Zum Licht Im Eis" -	4:14
Der Tanz Beginnt! -	5:14
Manchmal Noch... (Dancefloor-Mix) -	3:30

Intro: "Augenblick... Verweile Doch!" -	2:53
Verzeih' Mir! -	3:25
Sonnenkind -	4:43
Meine Zeit -	4:24
Am Ufer -	4:14
Abschied -	4:38
Ich Glaub' An Dich! -	5:13
Ich Kenn' Die Welt Nicht Mehr -	4:46
Augenblick -	6:31
Outro: "Für Immer Fort" -	3:41

Intro: Stiller Schrei -	4:49
Sturmwind -	4:19
Leben, Wo Gehst Du Hin? -	3:53
Zeit Der Wölfe -	4:25
Schließ' Die Augen! -	3:37
Wenn Alle Engel Fallen -	3:43
Menschenwolf -	4:12
Ein Letztes Märchen -	6:32
Requiem -	8:31
Outro: Am Ende Des Weges -	4:25

Der Himmel Über Dir -	5:40
Schatten Der Vergangenheit (Outro Verfall) -	3:15
Ein Morgen Am Meer -	4:56
Die Geburt Der Ozeaniden -	4:36
Vergessene Träume -	4:33
Verlorene Sommer Der Kindheit -	4:04
Für Immer Fort -	3:27
Der Vorhang Fällt -	5:37
Alles, Was Blieb -	4:33
Weil Du Es Bist -	3:46

Hinab -	1:27
Mein Leben Ohne Mich -	6:27
Kapitel 1: Neubeginn
Gemeinsam -	4:19
Neuland -	3:51
Traum Meines Lebens -	4:26
Kapitel 2: Krise
Nebenrolle -	4:35
Morgen Ein Stück Weiter -	4:37
Lauf, Wenn Du Kannst - 	5:54
Kapitel 3: Katastrophe
Götterdämmerung -	4:36
Am Rande des Seins -	1:42
Ausgezählt -	4:45
...Zurück nach oben -	2:00

Intro "Die im Dunkeln..."
ZwischenWelten
Du bist alles
Neue Welt
WoAnders
Es gab uns einst
Ultima Phoenix
Krank
Verloren

Intro
Gezeichnet
Wir sind okay!
In leeren Räumen
Glaubst du?
Ich lass' dich nicht mehr los!
Die ersten Tropfen fallen
Neue Regel
Fernab des Weges

Compilation albums 
10 x 10 (2003)
Splitter (2009)

Singles 
"Poesie"  (1993)
"Es atmet!"  (1994)
"Nur für dich" (1999)
"Dunkellicht" (2000)
"Bittersüßes" Gift (2001)
"GemEinsam" (2011)

References

External links 

Illuminate's web site
Illuminate at Discogs

German musical groups
Neue Deutsche Todeskunst groups
German gothic rock groups
Nuclear Blast artists